ROKS Go Jun Bong (LST-681) is the lead ship of the  in the Republic of Korea Navy.

Construction and commissioning 
The ship was launched in 1991 by Hanjin Heavy Industries at Busan and commissioned into the Navy in 1994.

On 23 April 2021, 33 COVID-19 cases were reported aboard Go Jun Bong.

References

Ships built by Hanjin Heavy Industries
Go Jun Bong-class tank landing ships
1991 ships